Jaroslav Veis (born April 19, 1946 in Prague) is a Czech journalist and science fiction writer. He edited Lidové noviny from 1991 to 1992. In science fiction his collection Pandořina skříňka (Pandora's Box) was widely admired.

References
The Encyclopedia of Science Fiction, page 292

Czech journalists
Czech science fiction writers
1946 births
Living people
International Writing Program alumni
Writers from Prague
Czech male writers